Pamela Anna Polland (born August 15, 1944) is an American singer-songwriter who made three albums for Epic and Columbia Records in the 1960s and 1970s and whose songs have been recorded by a number of popular artists. In the 1980s, she re-emerged as an independent recording artist and vocal coach, later working in film and TV scoring and Hawaiian music.

Biography

Early years
Pamela Polland composed her first song at the age of nine and by her teens was playing folk clubs. During this period, she formed a two-year alliance with Ry Cooder who accompanied her for performances of blues material.

Her recording career began a few years later, in 1966, when she and singer-songwriter Rick Stanley formed The Gentle Soul, a folk band with psychedelic influences and an emphasis on creative and elaborate vocal harmonies. Their self-titled album appeared on Epic Records together with a number of non-LP singles.

Following the dissolution of The Gentle Soul, Pamela set up home in Mill Valley, California before joining Joe Cocker and Leon Russell for the Mad Dogs and Englishmen tour in 1970. She can be heard and seen in the ensuing double album and film documentary respectively.

Songwriter and teacher
Polland's songs have been recorded by a considerable number of popular artists from the 60s onwards. These include Helen Reddy, who recorded "Music, Music" for her gold-selling album of the same name in 1976, and Linda Ronstadt, who recorded "I'd Like To Know". Among the most widely recorded of her songs is "Tulsa County", which has been interpreted by The Byrds, Bobby Bare, Anita Carter, Jesse Ed Davis, and Son Volt. More recently, singer-songwriter Alela Diane recorded Polland's "See My Love" when she guested as a vocalist for The Headless Heroes' 2008 covers album, "The Silence of Love". The original version of "See My Love" appeared on "The Gentle Soul".

By the 80s, Polland had also established herself as a vocal coach, and she later released the instructional DVD "Vocal Ease".

Solo artist
Her emergence as a solo artist began with the self-written album "Pamela Polland", which appeared on Columbia Records in 1972. Owing to changes of personnel at Columbia, Polland's follow-up album, "Have You Heard The One About The Gas Station Attendant?" (1973), recorded in London with producer Gus Dudgeon and featuring guest appearances from Joan Armatrading, as well as several members of Elton John's band and renowned arranger Paul Buckmaster, was shelved. Her next solo album was not to be until 1995's "Heart of the World", which combined her pop and jazz leanings with New Age sensibilities. The album, produced by Gary Malkin (Graceful Passages), also sported guest spots from Kenny Loggins, Bonnie Raitt, The Byrds' Chris Hillman, as well as Mike Marshall and several other well recorded musicians.

Public interest in the Epic/Columbia years was reawakened from 2003 onwards, when "The Gentle Soul" was reissued on CD in America. This was followed by Japanese reissues of "The Gentle Soul" as well as "Pamela Polland". Subsequently, both albums, along with "Heart Of The World", were made available on iTunes. The "Pamela Polland" album is also part of the Pandora internet radio library.

The unreleased 1973 Columbia album, believed to be an artistic triumph, has been referred to by Polland as "some of my best work". It saw its first release in March 2019 when the BGO label released a CD compiling that album and Polland's 1972 debut.

Melba Rounds

The unfortunate events at Columbia Records that curtailed Polland's first solo career prompted a change of direction, and – in the mid-seventies – she resumed activities under the name Melba Rounds. The fictional Melba Rounds was a bawdy and lubricious blues and jazz madam whose repertoire spanned the 1920s to the 1940s. Polland's "Melba Rounds Show" proved a hit in San Francisco, and was noted for its exuberance, extravagant costumes and dancers. The Melba Rounds Show demonstrated the breadth of Polland's stylistic repertoire and spawned a ten-year stint for her as principal vocalist with The Golden Age jazz band.

Hawaii
Following the release of "Heart of The World", Polland's self-published third solo album, she moved to Maui, Hawaii, and threw herself into local culture and music. She took up the ‘ukulele, studied local language, and became a hula dancer. Polland is currently band leader of Keaolani, a four-piece ‘ukulele band tutored by Hawaiian cultural experts Kahauanu Lake and Walter Kamuala‘i Kawai‘ae‘a. She is also the co-founder of Maui Film Music, through which she provides film and TV scores with Bobby Parrs. Polland's achievements as an artist and performer in Hawaiian music are such that she was requested to appear at Tony Curtis's 81st birthday party as well as a command performance for Anthony Hopkins.

In June 2010, Polland released "Hawaiianized", a five-track digital download EP available internationally via iTunes and other digital outlets. The mini-album, part one of an envisaged series, featured pop classics interpreted in Hawaiian style with new vocal arrangements and 'ukulele accompaniment from Polland. The collection was produced by John McFee of The Doobie Brothers, who had played on Polland's self-titled Columbia debut, and who also played a variety of acoustic and electric stringed instruments on the EP. The set's distinctive background vocals were sung by Sharon Celani, famous for her work with Stevie Nicks and others. "Hawaiianized" was bookended by two different versions of "Somewhere Over The Rainbow", prompting Sam Arlen, son of the song's composer Harold Arlen, to comment, "This version of my father's classic composition lifts the spirit while still tugging at the heartstrings to remind us that there is really no place like home. This disc deserves a home in your collection."

Personal life
Pamela is married to designer Bill Ernst with whom she has settled in Hawaii, on the island of Maui.

Discography

Albums
 Gentle Soul – The Gentle Soul (Epic, BN 26374, 1968)
All tracks written by Pamela Polland/Rick Stanley except where noted.
Tracks
"Overture" – 4:35
"Marcus" (Pamela Polland) – 2:52
"Song For Eolia" – 2:12
"Young Man Blue" (Rick Stanley) – 2:30
"Renaissance" – 3:10
"See My Love (Song For Greg)" (Pamela Polland) – 3:55
"Love Is Always Real" – 2:55
"Empty Wine" – 2:35
"Through a Dream" – 3:54
"Reelin'" (Pamela Polland) – 3:17
"Dance" (Rick Stanley/N.Wynn) – 3:23
Bonus Tracks
"Tell Me Love" (mono, single A-side) (Rick Stanley) – 2:24
"Song for Three" (mono, single B-side) (Pamela Polland/G.Copeland) – 2:56
"2:10 Train" (mono) (T.Campbell/L.Albertano) – 2:52
"Flying Thing" (previously unissued) (Jackson Browne) – 3:15
"God Is Love" (previously unissued) – 2:19
"You Move Me" (single A-side) (Pamela Polland) – 2:12
"Our National Anthem" (single B-side) (Pamela Polland) – 2:28
"Tell Me Love" (alternate version, previously unissued) (Rick Stanley) – 2:22
"Love Is Always Real" (alternate version, previously unissued) – 3:02

Personnel
Pamela Polland – female vocals, guitar
Rick Stanley – vocals, guitar
Tony Cohan – tabla
Ry Cooder, Mike Deasy – guitar
Van Dyke Parks – harpsichord
Paul Horn – flute
Ted Michel – cello
Larry Knechtel – organ
Bill Plummer – bass
Gayle Levant – harp
+
Riley Wyldflower – guitar
Jerry Cole – guitar
Joe Osborne – bass
Sandy Konikoff – drums
Hal Blaine – drums
Terry Melcher – producer on Tracks 1 through 11
 Pamela Polland (Columbia, KC 31116, 1972)
Produced by George Daly

 Have You Heard The One About The Gas Station Attendant? (Columbia, 1973)
Unreleased album, completed and mastered, Produced by Gus Dudgeon

 Heart of the World (Ivory Moon, 6795, 1995)
Produced by Gary Malkin

 Hawaiianized (Off The Leash/AWAL, 2010)
Produced by John McFee

References

External links
 Official website
 Keaolani Ukulele Band and Hula
 Maui Film Music
 Interview with Pamela Polland on A Bit Like You And Me

1944 births
20th-century American women singers
20th-century American singers
21st-century American women singers
21st-century American singers
American women music educators
American women pop singers
American women rock singers
American women singer-songwriters
Living people
Musicians from California
Singer-songwriters from California
Singer-songwriters from Hawaii